The weather in Antarctica can be highly variable, and weather conditions will oftentimes change dramatically in a short period of time. Weather conditions on the continent are classified in a number of ways, and restrictions placed upon workers and other staffs vary both by stations and by nations.

McMurdo Station (USA)

Scott Base (New Zealand) 

Climate and weather classification systems
Climate of Antarctica
Hazard scales
Severe weather and convection